is a Japanese manga artist. From 1999 to 2002, he authored the yonkoma comedy manga series Azumanga Daioh, which was later adapted as an anime series by J.C.Staff. In 2003, he began Yotsuba&!, a slice-of-life manga series about the adventures of a five-year-old girl; it is serialized in the monthly magazine Dengeki Daioh.

Works

References

External links 
  
 

 
1968 births
Living people
People from Takasago, Hyōgo
Manga artists from Hyōgo Prefecture
Osaka University of Arts alumni
Yotsuba&!